Bill Sindelar is an American actor, television host and warm-up comedian.

From 2002 to 2004, Sindelar was the host of Blister, a television series on G4 that previewed and reviewed action/adventure video games.

Sindelar has been the audience warm-up comedian for multiple TV series, including Hannah Montana, Dancing with the Stars, and The Talk.

In September 2011, Sindelar and television director Howie Meltzer launched OMGayTV, a hub for humor and entertainment with a "gay sensibility". Originally its own website, OMGayTV later moved to YouTube. From 2011 to 2012, Sindelar hosted and executive produced two shows for OMGayTV,  Uncut Clips of the Week and OMGay Walking.

From 2012 to 2017, Sindelar performed the voice of Lunch Lady Belinda in the stop-motion animated comedy web series The Most Popular Girls in School.

Filmography
Blister (2002) (Host)
Memron (2004) (Club Kid)Hannah Montana (2008) (Man 1) (1 episode)The Nevermore Chronicles (Markus) (1 episode)The Most Popular Girls in School'' (2012–17) (Lunch Lady Belinda, voice) (Clint) (14 episodes)

References

External links
 
 
 
 

Living people
Year of birth missing (living people)
American male television actors
American male voice actors
American television talk show hosts
American stand-up comedians